The Bourbon (pronounced  or ) is a sandwich biscuit consisting of two thin rectangular dark chocolate-flavoured biscuits with a chocolate buttercream filling. 

The biscuit was introduced in 1910 (originally under the name "Creola") by the biscuit company Peek Freans, of Bermondsey, London, originator of the Garibaldi biscuit. The Bourbon name, dating from the 1930s, comes from the former French royal House of Bourbon. A 2009 survey found that the Bourbon biscuit was the fifth most popular biscuit in the United Kingdom for dunking into tea.

The small holes in bourbon biscuits are to prevent the biscuits from cracking or breaking during the baking process, by allowing steam to escape.
Many other companies make their own version of the biscuit under the "Bourbon" name, including major supermarkets.

McVitie's chocolate-coated Penguin biscuits are made with the same biscuit mix as their bourbon biscuit, but the filling is different.

Etymology 
It is commonly believed that Peek Freans chose the name based on the French House of Bourbon.

References

External links
BBC News: The Link Between Bourbon Biscuits and Bourbon Whiskey

Biscuits
Products introduced in 1910
Food and drink introduced in 1910